Ayodele Max Adetula (born 9 February 1998) is a German professional footballer who plays as a winger for  club VfB Oldenburg.

Career
Adetula made his professional debut with Eintracht Braunschweig in the 3. Liga.

He joined Regionalliga Nord club VfB Oldenburg in October 2020, after his contract with Rot-Weiss Essen was terminated.

References

External links
 

1998 births
Living people
German footballers
Nigerian footballers
German sportspeople of Nigerian descent
Association football wingers
Eintracht Braunschweig players
Eintracht Braunschweig II players
Rot-Weiss Essen players
VfB Oldenburg players
3. Liga players
Regionalliga players